Amuri is town and union council of Chagai District in the Balochistan province of Pakistan.

References

Populated places in Chagai District
Union councils of Balochistan, Pakistan